Ignacio "Nacho" Díez de la Faya (born 23 April 1996) is a Spanish basketball player. Díez is currently the captain of Real Madrid Junior (Under-18) basketball team.

He is brother of Dani Díez, a Real Madrid basketball player.

Basketball career

H

He started his playing career in the Adecco Estudiantes, team that he left to join the U-14 Real Madrid Baloncesto in 2009. In his first seasons with Real Madrid, he obtained the Madrid Infantil (U-14) Championship in 2010 and the Madrid Cadete (U-16) Championship in 2012, being selected as the team's MVP.

In 2012 he joined Real Madrid Baloncesto junior team. In April 2013 they won the Madrid Junior (U-18) Championship by defeating Asefa Estudiantes in the final. A month later, they reached the third position in the Spanish Junior (U-18) Championship.

During the 2013/14 season he was appointed as Real Madrid junior team's captain. In January 2014, they won the prestigious Ciutat De L'Hospitalet Tournament (NIJT), a championship that Real Madrid hadn't won since 2006.

On 13 April 2014 Real Madrid junior team again won the Madrid Junior (U-18) Championship, by defeating Estudiantes and Torrelodones in the Final Four.

On 10 May 2014 Real Madrid won the 2014 Spain Junior (U-18) Championship, a title that they hadn't obtained for 14 years.

Teams
2003/09  Estudiantes
2009/10  U-14 Infantil Real Madrid Baloncesto 
2010/12  U-16 Cadete Real Madrid Baloncesto
2012/14  U-18 Junior Real Madrid Baloncesto
2014-  Bloomfield College

Spanish national team

In April 2014 he played with Under-18 Spanish national team at Barakaldo Tournament. Later that month, he was preselected to participate in the 2014 FIBA Europe Under-18 Championship, to be played during summer 2014 at Konya (Turkey).

Awards and honors

Real Madrid
 Champion of Madrid Infantil (U-14) Championship 2010.
 Champion of Madrid Cadete (U-16) Championship 2012.
 Champion of Madrid Junior (U-18) Championship 2013 and 2014.
 Champion of Ciutat De L'Hospitalet Tournament (NIJT) 2014.
 Champion of Spain Junior (U-18) Championship 2014.

References

External links
 Euroleague web player profile
 Real Madrid player profile

1996 births
Living people
Bloomfield Bears men's basketball players
Forwards (basketball)
Real Madrid Baloncesto players
Spanish men's basketball players
Basketball players from Madrid